The Salem witch trials were a series of hearings and prosecutions of people accused of witchcraft in colonial Massachusetts between February 1692 and May 1693.

Salem witch trials could also refer to:

Media
Salem (TV series), an American television series inspired by the Salem witch trials
"Salem Witch Trials", an episode of Haunted History (2013 TV series)
"Salem Witch Trials", an episode of History's Mysteries
"Salem Witch Trials", an episode of In Search of History
"Salem Witch Trials", an episode of Unsolved History
Salem Witch Trials (film), a 2003 American-Canadian historical drama
"Salem Witches", an episode of In Search of... (TV series)
The Witch of Salem, a 1913 American silent short drama film

Other
Salem Witches (baseball), a baseball team in Lowell and Salem Massachusetts
Salem witchcraft trial (1878), an 1878 lawsuit alleging witchcraft

See also
Connecticut Witch Trials, a series of witch trials which also occurred in New England
Cultural depictions of the Salem witch trials
List of people of the Salem witch trials
Timeline of the Salem witch trials